Craig Snider is an American softball coach who is the current head coach at Texas Tech.

Coaching career

Texas A&M (asst.)
On June 6, 2019, Texas A&M added Snider to the softball staff as an assistant coach under head coach Jo Evans.

Texas Tech
On June 20, 2022, Craig Snider was announced as the new head coach of the Texas Tech softball program.

Head coaching record

College

References

Living people

Year of birth missing (living people)
American softball coaches
Oklahoma Sooners softball coaches
Stephen F. Austin Ladyjacks coaches
Texas A&M Aggies softball coaches
Florida State Seminoles softball coaches
Texas Tech Red Raiders softball coaches
People from Simpson County, Kentucky